This is a list of consorts of Naples. Many kings of Naples had more than one wife; they may have divorced their wife or she might have died.

Early Byzantine Duchesses of Naples 
See Also: Dukes of Naples

 Drosu, wife of Sergius I
 Theodora, Roman senatrix, daughter of Giovanni and his wife Theodora, daughter of Theophylacto I of Tusculum & his wife Theodora; wife of John III
 Limpiasa of Capua, daughter of Richard I of Capua and Fredesenda of Hauteville, married Sergius VI in April 1078 also held title of Protosebastē 
 Eva (or Anna) of Gaeta, daughter of Geoffrey Ridell, Duke of Gaeta, wife of John VI, also held title of Protosebastē

Royal consort of Naples

Capetian House of Anjou, 1266–1382

House of Anjou-Durazzo, 1382–1435 

The rule of the House of Durazzo was contested by the Dukes of Anjou of the House of Valois, who led several military expeditions into the kingdom. In the end Queen Joanna II, being heirless, recognized Duke Louis III in 1426 as Duke of Calabria and heir. Louis predeceased her, but his brother René inherited his claim. Joanna recognised René as her heir before her death.

House of Valois-Anjou, 1382–1426 and 1435–1442

Louis I, Duke of Anjou, was the adopted heir of Joanna I. He succeeded her, de jure, on her death in 1382. His descendants fought the House of Durazzo, mostly in vain, but not without any successes, for the throne until an agreement was reached between Louis III and Joanna II whereby she recognised him and his house as her heirs. René, Louis's brother, succeeded Joanna in 1435.

René had a contestant in King Alfonso V of Aragon who had been previously considered as a successor by Joanna II but had been later discarded in favour of René's brother. Alfonso conquered the kingdom manu militari and René was forced to flee. René's claim was inherited by either his nephew (Charles IV of Anjou, who died in 1481, leaving his claims to French king Louis XI) or his grandson (René II of Lorraine). The latter's descendants continued to claim the throne of Naples, as did the French kings, down to 1529, and intermittently until 1559.

House of Trastámara, 1442–1501

The French conquered the kingdom in 1501 and King Frederick was taken as a prisoner to France, where he died.

House of Valois-Orléans, 1501–1504

The kingdom was conquered by the Spanish in 1504, after the Battle of the Garigliano

House of Trastamara, 1504–1516

House of Habsburg, 1516–1700

House of Bourbon, 1700–1713

The Spanish lost the kingdom to the Austrians during the War of the Spanish Succession.

House of Habsburg, 1714–1734

The kingdom was conquered by a Spanish army in 1734, during the War of the Polish Succession. Together with Sicily Naples was recognized independent under a cadet branch of the Spanish Bourbons by the Treaty of Vienna in 1738.

House of Bourbon, 1735–1806

House of Bonaparte and House of Murat, 1806–1815

House of Bourbon, 1815–1816
none

In 1816 King Ferdinand IV merged the two Kingdoms of Naples and Sicily into the new Kingdom of the Two Sicilies and took the new title of Ferdinand I, King of the Two Sicilies.

See also 
List of monarchs of Naples
Duchess of Calabria 
List of royal consorts of the Kingdom of the Two Sicilies 
List of Sicilian consorts 
List of Italian consorts
List of Sardinian consorts
List of Aragonese consorts
Royal Consorts of Spain
List of French consorts
List of Angevin consorts
List of Lotharingian consorts

Notes

Sources 
SOUTHERN ITALY

 
Naples
Naples
Consorts
Neapolitan
Naples consorts